Galuma Maymuru (born 1951) is an Australian painter, printmaker and sculptor from Yirrkala in Arnhem Land in the Northern Territory.

Biography 

Maymuru was born on 8 August 1951 in Yirrkala in north-east Arnhem Land, the daughter of renowned artist Narritjin Maymuru. She grew up on the Yirrkala Mission.

Maymuru lived throughout the homelands of her Manggalili people, spending time at the Dhuruputjpi, Djarrakpi and Yilpara. Manggalili is her language group.

She was a school teacher before her father encouraged her to begin her artistic practice and began to train her. Her first solo exhibition was in 1999 at the William Mora Galleries in Melbourne. She is one of the first generation of Yolngu women to become major artists.

In 2003, Maymuru was awarded the bark painting prize at the Telstra National Aboriginal & Torres Strait Islander Art Award for her painting Guwak.

Her work is held in major collections around Australia including the Art Gallery of New South Wales, the Sydney Opera House, the National Museum of Australia, the Museum and Art Gallery of the Northern Territory, the Harland Collection, the Ballarat Fine Art Gallery and the Berndt Museum of Anthropology at the University of Western Australia.

References

Further reading 

 

1951 births
Living people
20th-century Australian women artists
20th-century Australian artists
21st-century Australian women artists
21st-century Australian artists
Artists from the Northern Territory
Australian Aboriginal artists